Yang Shaoqi ( or , , born 8 February 1976) is a Chinese fencer. She won a bronze medal in the women's team épée event at the 2000 Summer Olympics.

References

1976 births
Living people
Chinese female fencers
Olympic fencers of China
Fencers at the 2000 Summer Olympics
Olympic bronze medalists for China
Olympic medalists in fencing
Medalists at the 2000 Summer Olympics
Asian Games medalists in fencing
Fencers at the 1998 Asian Games
Asian Games gold medalists for China
Asian Games bronze medalists for China
Medalists at the 1998 Asian Games
Universiade medalists in fencing
Universiade gold medalists for China
Medalists at the 2001 Summer Universiade
20th-century Chinese women